Sinthusa malika is a species of butterfly of the family Lycaenidae. It is found in South-East Asia.

Subspecies
Sinthusa malika malika (Java)
Sinthusa malika amata Distant, 1886 (southern Thailand, Peninsular Malaya, Langkawi, Sumatra)
Sinthusa malika niasicola Fruhstorfer, 1912 (Nias)

References

Butterflies described in 1829
Sinthusa